Osvát Laskai (1450, Laskó, Baranya county – June 10, 1511, Pest? ) was a Hungarian Franciscan friar, preacher, teacher of theology, head of the friaries of Esztergom and Pest.

Works
Quadragesimale Bige salutis. U. ott, 1498., 1501., 1506. and 1515.
Sermones dominicales pertutiles a quodam fratre Hungaro ordinis minorum de observantia comportati Biga salutis intitulati feliciter incipiunt. Hagenau, 1498., 1502., 1506. and 1515.
Sermones de sanctis perutiles. U. ott, 1499., 1502., 1506. and 1516.
Sermones dominicales pertutiles. U. ott, 1499. és 1516.
Quadragesimale Gemma fidei intitulatum tractans de sacrosancta orthodoxaq. fide catholica ... U. ott, 1507. 
Pelbartus de Temeswar, Aureum Rosarium Theologie. Hagenau, 1503., 1504., 1507. and 1508. Four volumes 
In the Glossaries of Gyöngyös: Constitutiones familiae Hungariae observantium, cura vicarialis fratri Osvaldi de Lasko, in capitulo Athyensi 1499. editas cum additionibus probabiliter et statutis Pakosiensibus, descriptas manu cujusdam Fratris Ladislai a. 1512

References

1511 deaths
Hungarian writers
15th-century Latin writers
15th-century Hungarian people
16th-century Hungarian people
Hungarian Franciscans
1450 births